Julián Mateos (15 January 1938 – 27 December 1996) was a Spanish actor and film producer. He appeared in 48 films and television shows between 1960 and 1980. He starred in the film The Robbers, which was entered into the 12th Berlin International Film Festival.

He died on 27 December 1996 from a lung cancer at the age of 57.

Partial filmography

 Las estrellas (1961) - Miguel
 Juventud a la intemperie (1961) - Toni
 No dispares contra mí (1961) - Luigi
 The Robbers (1962) - Carmelo Barrachina 'Compadre' 
 Los castigadores (1962) - Pepe
 Los desamparados (1962)
 El precio de un asesino (1963) - Miguel Velasco
 Young Sánchez (1964) - Paco / Young Sánchez
 Crimen (1964) - Carlos
 Cyrano and d'Artagnan (1964) - Marquis de Cinq-Mars
 Tiempo de amor (1964) - Servando
 La Celestina P... R... (1965)
 Return of the Seven (1966) - Chico
 10:30 P.M. Summer (1966) - Rodrigo Palestra
 The Hellbenders (1967) - Ben
 El último sábado (1967) - José Luis Sánchez
 Oscuros sueños de agosto (1968) - Mario
 Los flamencos (1968) - Diego
 ...dai nemici mi guardo io! (1968) - Hondo
 Shalako (1968) - Rojas
 The Wanton of Spain (1969) - Calixto
 Les Étrangers (1969) - Kaine
 Bohemios (1969) - Roberto Randel
 Four Rode Out (1970) - Frenando Nunez
 Ann and Eve (1970) - Hotel Porter
 The Kashmiri Run (1970) - Ramtgen
 Hembra (1970)
 La orilla (1971) - Juan
 Cold Eyes of Fear (1971) - Quill
 Catlow (1971) - Recalde 
 La otra imagen (1973)
 El último viaje (1974) - Máximo
 Death's Newlyweds (1975) - Joaquín 'Chimo'
 La endemoniada [AKA Demon Witch Child] (1975) - Father Juan
 Forget the Drums (1975)
 La Carmen (1976)
 Los santos inocentes (1984, producer)
 Voyage to Nowhere (1986, producer)

References

External links

1938 births
1996 deaths
Spanish male film actors
Spanish film producers
20th-century Spanish male actors
University of Salamanca alumni
Deaths from lung cancer in Spain